Graphium stresemanni is a vulnerable species of butterfly in the family Papilionidae. It is endemic to the Indonesian island of Seram. It closely resembles the related Graphium weiskei, a more common species from New Guinea but has been treated as a distinct species. It is rare. The species was first described by Walter Rothschild in 1916.

Taxonomy
Graphium batjanensis described by Okano in 1984 appears to be allopatric to G. stresemanni and the same species. It has also been suggested to be conspecific with G. weiskei.

References

Sources

Müller, C. J. & Tennent, W. J. (1999). "A New Species of Graphium Scopoli (Lepidoptera: Papilionidae) from the Bismarck Archipelago, Papua New Guinea 1999". Records of the Australian Museum. 51: 161-168. Presents a key to the closely related Graphium kosii, Graphium weiskei (Ribbe), G. stresemanni (Rothschild), G. batjanensis Okano (see note), G. macleayanum (Leach) and G. gelon (Boisduval) all of which are confined to the Australasian region.
Okano, K. (1984). "On the butterflies of Graphium weiskei group (Papilionidae) with description of a new species". Tokurana (Acta Rhopalocera). 8 (1): 1-20.

External links

"Graphium stresemanni (Rothschild, 1916)". Insecta.pro. With images.

stresemanni
Insects of Indonesia
Endemic fauna of Seram Island
Lepidoptera of New Guinea
Taxonomy articles created by Polbot
Butterflies described in 1916